The 1984 Ms. Olympia contest was an IFBB professional bodybuilding competition was held on November 24, 1984, at the Place des Arts in Montreal, Quebec. It was the 5th Ms. Olympia competition held.

Results

Notable Events

 The first time the contest was held outside the United States.
Olympia competitor to compete.

See also
 1984 Mr. Olympia

References

 SPORTS OF THE TIMES; A MATTER OF MUSCLES
 Ms. Olympia Turns 30
 1984 Ms Olympia Results

External links
 Competitor History of the Ms. Olympia

Ms. Olympia
Ms. Olympia
Ms. Olympia
History of female bodybuilding

es:Ms. Olympia
it:Ms. Olympia
he:גברת אולימפיה
nl:Ms. Olympia
pl:Ms. Olympia
pt:Ms. Olympia
sv:Ms. Olympia